The Lorraine railway viaduct, or Lorraineviadukt, is a railway viaduct in the Swiss city of Bern. It carries the Olten–Bern railway across the River Aare immediately to the north of Bern railway station. The Lorraine road bridge is adjacent.

The bridge was built in concrete by the Swiss Federal Railways to replace the aging Rote Brücke and opened in 1941.

See also
List of Aare bridges in Bern

References

External links

Lorraine viaduct on Structurae

Bridges completed in 1941
Bridges over the Aare
Railway bridges in Switzerland
20th-century architecture in Switzerland